Even though its territory spans four geographical time zones (from +3 to +6), standard time in Kazakhstan is either UTC+05:00 or UTC+06:00. These times apply throughout the year as Kazakhstan does not observe Daylight saving time.

IANA time zone database 
The tz database identifies seven zones for Kazakhstan. Data in columns marked * are from the file zone.tab of the database.

According to an email on the tz mailing list, Kostanay Region could be part of Asia/Qyzylorda .

Time by region 

Notes:
 (1) Almaty, Astana and Shymkent cities have the status of State importance and do not relate to any region.
 (2) Baikonur city has a special status because it is currently being leased to Russia with Baikonur cosmodrome until 2050.

See also 
 Omsk Time

References